During his 40-year career, the Indonesian pop singer Chrisye (1949–2007) released 20 studio albums, 2 tribute or cover albums, 2 soundtrack albums, 10 compilation albums, an indie album, and 56 singles. He also recorded the soundtrack to three feature films, acted in two, and released 26 music videos. In 2008 Rolling Stone Indonesia listed five albums to which Chrisye contributed (Badai Pasti Berlalu [1977] at 1, Guruh Gipsy [1976] at 2, Sabda Alam [1978] at 51, Puspa Indah [1980] at 57, and Resesi [1983] at 82) as among the best Indonesian albums of all time.

After starting his professional music career as a bass guitarist with the band Sabda Nada (later renamed Gipsy) in the late 1960s, Chrisye released his first album, Guruh Gipsy, in 1976; the indie album was a collaboration between Gipsy and Guruh Sukarnoputra. and saw Chrisye's first single as a singer, "Chopin Larung". The following year, he recorded "Lilin-Lilin Kecil" for the Prambors Radio Teenage Songwriting Competition; the single, written by James F. Sundah, became his signature song. Also in 1977 he recorded the soundtrack to Teguh Karya's successful film Badai Pasti Berlalu with Berlian Hutauruk; the film's soundtrack album, released several months later, went on to sell over nine million copies, making it one of the most successful Indonesian albums of all time. During this period he also released the highly unsuccessful Jurang Pemisah with Jockie Soerjoprajogo; Chrisye later described its sales as "warm as chicken shit".

The successes of Guruh Gipsy, "Lilin-Lilin Kecil", and Badai Pasti Berlalu led Amin Widjaja of Musica Studios to sign Chrisye; he would stay with the company for the rest of his career. With Musica he released his first solo album, Sabda Alam, which sold well. His next album, Percik Pesona (1979), was a critical and commercial failure, leading Chrisye to stop his work with Jockie. He then began work on Puspa Indah (1980), using mostly songs written by Guruh. For promotion, Chrisye had a cameo in the film Puspa Indah Taman Hati (1979), in which he sang "Galih dan Ratna" and "Gita Cinta". Because Chrisye was disappointed with his only major acting role, in Seindah Rembulan (1980), and the failure of his next album, Pantulan Cita (1981), he took a two-year sabbatical. In 1983 Chrisye, having become inspired by the return of Eros Djarot from Germany, began recording a trilogy of albums with Jockie and Djarot. After the trio disbanded in 1984, Chrisye – after releasing another solo album, Sendiri (1984) – produced three albums with young songwriter Adjie Soetomo; the most successful of these, Aku Cinta Dia (1985) sold over a million copies. This collaboration was followed by three albums arranged by Younky Suwarno: Jumpa Pertama (1988), Pergilah Kasih (1989), and Sendiri Lagi (1993). During this period Chrisye released his first music video, for the song "Pergilah Kasih" (1989); the video, directed by Jay Subyakto, was the first Indonesian song to be shown on MTV Southeast Asia.

Beginning with AkustiChrisye in 1996, Chrisye's next several albums were arranged by Erwin Gutawa. The music video for the titular song of their next collaboration, Kala Cinta Menggoda (1997), won the MTV Video Music Award for South-East Asia on 10 September 1998. The two then collaborated on rerecording the Badai Pasti Berlalu soundtrack album, releasing their version with orchestral music and new duets. Two years later, the music video for "Setia" from Konser Tur 2001 stirred up controversy for its portrayal of a woman in skintight clothing, considered against Eastern values. Chrisye's final collaboration with Gutawa, Dekade, was a cover album which featured a song written exclusively for the album by Pongky of Jikustik. The singer's last studio album, Senyawa (2004), was a collaboration with other Indonesian artists, which Chrisye arranged.

The first compilation album of Chrisye's works, Chrisye Terbaik, was released in 1987; this was followed by several more during the 1990s. Several more were released After the singer was diagnosed with lung cancer in 2005, including three in the year of his death. In 2008 a single that had been recorded secretly, "Lirih", was released. Its music video featured Ariel of Peterpan, Giring from Nidji, and Chrisye's widow Yanti.

Albums
All music certifications are from Indonesia and are issued by the Recording Industry Association of Indonesia.

Studio albums

Indie albums

Soundtrack albums

Tributes

Compilation albums

Singles

Video

Soundtracks

Music videos

Other video

See also
List of songs recorded by Chrisye

Notes

References
Footnotes

Bibliography

Discographies of Indonesian artists